Trzetrzewina  is a village in the administrative district of Gmina Chełmiec, within Nowy Sącz County, Lesser Poland Voivodeship, in southern Poland.

The village has a population of 1,670.

References

Trzetrzewina